Judge Bryan may refer to:

Albert Vickers Bryan (1899–1984), judge of the United States Court of Appeals for the Fourth Circuit
Albert Vickers Bryan Jr. (1926–2019), judge of the United States District Court for the Eastern District of Virginia
Frederick van Pelt Bryan (1904–1978), judge of the United States District Court for the Southern District of New York
George Seabrook Bryan (1809–1905), judge of the United States District Court for the District of South Carolina
Nathan Philemon Bryan (1872–1935), judge of the United States Court of Appeals for the Fifth Circuit
Robert Jensen Bryan (born 1934), judge of the United States District Court for the Western District of Washington

See also
Justice Bryan (disambiguation)
Judge Bryant (disambiguation)